The Imías Formation is a geologic formation in Cuba. It preserves fossils dating back to the Miocene period.

Fossil content 
 Decapoda indet.

See also 
 List of fossiliferous stratigraphic units in Cuba

References

Further reading 
 
 C. E. Schweitzer, M. Iturralde Vinent, J. L. Hetler and J. Vélez Juarbe. 2006. Oligocene and Miocene decapods (Thalassinidea and Brachyura) from the Caribbean. Annals of Carnegie Museum 75(2):111-136

Geologic formations of Cuba
Neogene Cuba
Marl formations
Limestone formations
Evaporite deposits
Tidal deposits
Lagoonal deposits
Formations